The men's 71 kg competition in judo at the 1992 Summer Olympics in Barcelona was held on 31 July at the Palau Blaugrana. The gold medal was won by Toshihiko Koga of Japan.

Results

Main brackets

Pool A

Pool B

Repechages

Repechage A

Repechage B

Final

Final classification

References

External links
 

M71
Judo at the Summer Olympics Men's Lightweight
Men's events at the 1992 Summer Olympics